Iragbiji (also Ira-gba-iji) is a town and capital of Boripe Local Government Area, Osun State, Nigeria, sharing borders with many towns especially Ikirun and is inhabited by the Yoruba people. The population of Iragbiji people is about 164,172.

Location 
Iragbiji is allocated at "an elevation of 429 meters above sea level. It uses Africa/Lagos UTC/GMT+1 as the standard time zone".

History and oral tradition 

According to local history the name Iragbiji came into being over 600 years ago, it was reported that first settlers had their habitation under an IRA tree (Bradilier Thongy). The town was founded by a great hunter from Ejio compound in Moore, Ile Ife called Sunkungbade (Obebe). The man Sunkungbade got his name from a seeming drama he created while he was still a child. He was said to be in the habit of crying ceaselessly and not even the sweetness from his mother's breasts could stop the little boy. As it was the practice in those days, ifa oracle had to be consulted to unravel the mystery behind the boy's attitude.  It was ifa that advised the parents to make a miniature crown for the little Sunkungbade and that anytime he his crying, the crown his parents should put the crown on his head to calm him down. The oracle's advice worked like magic and, that was how Sunkungbade (he who cried to get a crown) was added to his names; the Ifa priest called Oladunjoye foretold that Sunkungbade would at adulthood request that he be allowed to leave to found his own community and that should not be disallowed. Soon after the child got matured, he started exhibiting all the traits earlier foretold. He was courageous, Intelligent, strong-willed and exceptional in tradition and culture. He was a great hunter who was said to have had mystic powers, he married Oloyade. Soon after, he approached his parents without any fear and requested that he should be allowed to leave to found his own settlement. As earlier forewarned, the parents gave their blessing. The journey of Sunkungbade was not a straight one from Ile Ife to Iragbiji but one which took him round Ijeshaland before he got to his real destination.

Traditional institutions 
The Sukungbade's descendants broken down into four ruling houses: Ajibode,  Ogunmolu, Osungbemi, and Arowodoye/Arodoye.

They have been Aragbijis in unbroken succession since the founding of Iragbiji. The present Aragbiji, Oba Rasheed Ayotunde Olabomi, Odundun IV is the fourth on the Ajibode Ruling House Lineage.

Tourist attractions 
Iragbiji has a number of natural tourist sites, some of which are as follows: Okanyilule (Double hills), Ile-Ona Museum of Art and Archival materials (collection of M.O.), The Palace museum, Igbodu place/Cave Ori Oke, Ayeye (mythical stream), Alagaso water source, Alagaso cave, Oke Moori, Okuta Odo (Motar) hill, Osun shrine, Obatala shrine, Igbo Igbale, Isikan hill, Ile Nla (Antiquated palace building), Ota Igun hill, Gbanla/Oso Osi site, Ojolukoko shrine, Oba Ogunmolu shrine, Isanpa, Traditional war fence (Earth), Traditional stone wall fence, Sanpona shrine Oke Agbo and Ira Tree site.

List of Boripe Local Government Chairmen From 1991 till Date 
Boripe local government was created in 1991

1.                  Prince Gboyega Famoodun    

2.                  Elder Bode Aremu

3.                  Alhaji Kareem Adegboyega Afolabi

4.                  Chief Adeniyi Aina

5.                  Elder Ruben Ajayi

6.                  Prince Bimbo Oyedele

7.                  Hon. Kehinde Hassan Moronkeji

8.                  Hon. Tajudeen Abiodun Ayantoye

9.                  Hon. (Rev) Oyeyiola Adelani Adebayo
  
10.                       Hon.  Adeyemi Fatai tayelolu

Educational institutions

List of Educational Institutions 
Iragbiji is currently experiencing growth in size with number of educational institutions as evident below;

Public primary schools 
1.                  N. U. D School 1, Isale Oyo, Iragbiji

2.                  N. U. D. School 2, Isale Oyo, Iragbiji

3.                  St. Peters Anglican Primary School, Oloti Area, Iragbiji

4.                  Baptist Primary School, Isale Oyo, Iragbiji

5.                  C & S Primary School, Ajegunle Area, Iragbiji

6.                  Oba Rasheed Ayotunde Olabomi Model Primary School, Orita Odan, Iragbiji

7.                  C. A. C. Primary School, Idi-Isakaagba, Iragbiji

8.                  L. A. Primary School, Popo, Iragbiji

9.                  L. A. Primary School Eesade, Iragbiji

10.               Methodist Primary School, Otapete Area, Iragbiji

11.               Ajani Okin Memorial Primary School, Adugbo, Iragbiji

Less City

12.              C. A. C. Primary School, Idi-Ogungun

13.              Community Primary School, Oore

14.              Community Primary School, Odebudo

15.              Aderibigbe Memorial Primary School, Eleesun

16.              Agbeniga Community Primary School, Aro Ayedaade

17.              D. C. Primary School, Egbeda

18.              Community Primary School, Ayekale

Public secondary schools 
1.            Oke Iragbiji Grammar School, Iragbiji

2.            Baptist Secondary Grammar School, Iragbiji

3.            Unity School, Iragbiji

4.            Nawar-ud-Deen Grammar School, Isale Oyo, Iragbiji

Private nursery / primary schools 
1.            FOMWAN Nursery School, Adugbo, Iragbiji

2.            God Supremacy Nursery & Primary School, Iragbiji

3.            Our Lady of Fatimah Nursery & Primary School,  Adikoko, Iragbiji

4.            Pace Setter Nursery & Primary School, Egbeda Road, Iragbiji

5.            Onward Nursery & Primary School, Iragbiji

6.            Gods Heritage Nursery & Primary School, Iragbiji

7.            Prince of Peace Nursery & Primary School, Iragbiji

8.            Ibad Rahaman Nursery & Primary School, Iragbiji

9.            Dunit Nursery & Primary School, Iragbiji

10.         Markaz Nursery & Primary School, Iragbiji

11.         A2 Group of Schools, Isale Oyo, Iragbiji

Private secondary schools

1.            FOMWAN High School, Iragbiji

2.            Victory Scientific High School, Iragbiji

3.            A2 Comprehensive High School, Iragbiji

4.            Muslim Comprehensive High School, Iragbiji

5.            Pace Setter Group of Schools, Iragbiji

Tertiary institutions 
1.    Pathfinder College of Health Technology, Isanpa, Iragbiji.

2.    Proposed Bisola University,  Egbeda Road, Iragbiji

3.    Osun State College of Education Ilesa Sandwich Centre, Oke-Iragbiji Grammar School, Iragbiji

Health institutions 
Comprehensive Health Centre, Iragbiji
Four Primary Health Centres (Public)
Ten Private Hospitals/Medical Centres, Iragbiji
National Primary Health Centre, Iragbiji (Inoperational)

As of 2006, about 75% of children in five different schools in Iragbiji were found to have intestinal helminth parasites (a type of parasitic worm).

References 

Populated places in Osun State